Sweet Emma, Dear Böbe is a 1992 Hungarian drama film directed by István Szabó. It was entered into the 42nd Berlin International Film Festival where it won the Silver Bear - Special Jury Prize. The film was selected as the Hungarian entry for the Best Foreign Language Film at the 65th Academy Awards, but was not accepted as a nominee.

Plot
The film shows the political system's changes in Budapest. The Sweet Emma, Dear Böbe shows the losers of the change and their searching of way. After that Russian language had been removed from compulsory subjects of Hungarian schools the two Russian teachers, Emma and Böbe became redundant. The teaching staff also were shaken of insecurity, accusing each other. Emma and Böbe are learning English in the evenings. Emma also sells newspapers and she has an affair with the married school director, who is not too brave to decide. One of the best scenes of the film when Böbe and many naked women - teachers and nurses - are waiting for casting in a film studio. Böbe is acquainted with foreigners and she trades in foreign currencies. Böbe will be arrested and she finally jumps out of the window of the teachers' accommodation.

"Szabó's sensitive handling of the material culminates in a meditative passage in which Emma stands in church, musing on the 'passion for love' which masks lack of purpose. 'Collective sin' may be dead, according to Böbe, but this movingly delineates the private pain of atonement"- Time Out Film Guide.

Cast
 Johanna ter Steege as Emma
 Enikö Börcsök as Böbe
 Péter Andorai as Stefanics - Director
 Éva Kerekes as Szundi
 Ildikó Bánsági as Emma (voice)
 Irma Patkós as Hermina
 Erzsi Pásztor as Rózsa
 Hédi Temessy as Mária
 Irén Bódis as Emma's mother
 Erzsi Gaál as Storekeeper
 Zoltán Mucsi as Szilárd, Art teacher
 Tamás Jordán as Szaglár Capt.
 Gábor Máté as Officer

Awards
1992 Berlin International Film Festival, Won Prize of the Ecumenical Jury - Special Mention,  Competition- István Szabó 
1992 Berlin International Film Festival, Silver Berlin Bear, Special Jury Prize- István Szabó 
1992 European Film Award, Best Screenwriter- István Szabó

See also
 List of submissions to the 65th Academy Awards for Best Foreign Language Film
 List of Hungarian submissions for the Academy Award for Best Foreign Language Film

References

External links

Time Out Film Reviews

1992 films
1992 drama films
Hungarian drama films
1990s Hungarian-language films
Films directed by István Szabó
Silver Bear Grand Jury Prize winners